U.S. Route 441 (US 441) stretches for  through the mountains of East Tennessee, connecting Rocky Top with Knoxville, Sevierville, Gatlinburg, and the Great Smoky Mountains National Park, crossing into North Carolina at Newfound Gap. Near its northern terminus, US 441 crosses over Norris Dam and passes through Norris Dam State Park.

Route description

Sevier County

SR 71 begins concurrent with US 441 within the Great Smoky Mountains National Park at the North Carolina state line on  Newfound Gap. US 441/SR 71 is known as Newfound Gap Road within the park, and follows along a valley carved by the West Prong of the Little Pigeon River as a narrow and curvy 2-Lane highway. Newfound Gap Road then becomes concurrent with SR 73 Scenic (Little River Road) before having an interchange with the Gatlinburg Bypass and entering the city of Gatlinburg, where US 441/SR 71/SR 73 Scenic leaves the park and becomes Parkway, a 4-lane undivided highway as it passes through the city. Parkway then has an intersection with US 321/SR 73 (East Parkway), where SR 73 Scenic ends and US 321/SR 73 joins Parkway. Parkway heads north to have another  interchange with the Garlinburg Bypass before leaving Garlinburg and becoming a divided highway known as the Foothills Parkway Spur (more commonly known as The Spur). Parkway then enters the city of Pigeon Forge and widens to a 6-lane. It passes through the city and has an intersection with SR 449 (Dollywood Lane/Veterans Boulevard) before US 321/SR 73 head north along Wears Valley Road. US 441/SR 71 (Parkway) then crosses a bridge over the West Prong of the Little Pigeon River to enter Sevierville. They pass by several tourist attractions and a Tanger Outlets before again crossing the West Prong of the Little Pigeon River and turning of the Parkway and north onto Forks of the River Parkway at the southern edge of downtown. They bypass downtown on the west side as an undivided highway before coming to an intersection with SR 66 (Winfield Dunn Parkway) and US 411/SR 35 (W Main Street), where US 441/SR 71 turns left to become concurrent with US 411/SR 35 as a 4-lane undivided highway known as Chapman Highway. Chapman Highway then crosses a bridge over West Prong of the Little Pigeon River and leaves Sevierville as a divided highway through rural areas. It then passes through some mountainous areas as an undivided highway before entering Seymour. Chapman Highway passes by several homes and businesses before coming to an intersection with SR 338 (Boyds Creek Highway), where US 411/SR 35 heads south along Maryville Highway. US 441/SR 71 (Chapman Highway) continues north to pass through a small portion of Blount County before leaving Seymour and crossing into Knox County.

Knox County

US 441/SR 71 (Chapman Highway) passes through suburban areas as it enters South Knoxville. It has an interchange with SR 168 (Governor John Sevier Highway) before passing through a business district. SR 71 then breaks off along E Moody Avenue just before becoming concurrent with SR 33 (Martin Mill Pike) and crossing the Tennessee River into downtown Knoxville via the Henley Street Bridge. US 441/SR 33 passes through downtown as a 6-lane divided highway (known as Henley Street), where it has a partial interchange with I-40/I-275 and an intersection with SR 62 (Western Avenue). The highway narrows to a 4-lane undivided to cross a bridge over some railroad tracks before passing under I-40 and passing through neighborhoods as Broadway. US 441/SR 33 then have a partial interchange with Hall of Fame Drive (unsigned SR 71), with SR 71 rejoining US 441/SR 33. Broadway the crosses Sharp's Ridge to enter Fountain City, where it has an intersection with SR 331 (Old Broadway) and an interchange with I-640/US 25W/SR 9 (Exit 6). Broadway has a partial interchange with SR 331 (Tazewell Pike) before it passes through a business district before passing through downtown. It then becomes a divided highway as it crosses a ridge, where it leaves Fountain City and Knoxville to enter Halls Crossroads. Broadway now becomes Maynardville Pike and passes through suburban areas and business districts before US 441/SR 71 splits off from SR 33 (Maynardville Pike) along Norris Freeway as a 4-lane undivided highway shortly before having an intersection with SR 131 (E Emory Road). The highway then narrows to 2-lanes and leaves Halls Crossroads to pass through rural areas. It then becomes concurrent with SR 170 (Old Raccoon Valley Road) before crossing into Anderson County.

Anderson County

SR 170 splits off from US 441/SR 71 (Norris Freeway) along Hickory Valley Road before US 441/SR 71 continues north through rural areas to enter the city of Norris, where they have a short concurrency with SR 61 (Andersonville Highway/Charles G. Seviers Boulevard) before passing through Norris Dam State Park and crossing the Clinch River on top of the Norris Dam. The highway turns east and becomes windy and curvy as its crosses into Campbell County twice for short distances before re entering Anderson County to enter Rocky Top. US 441/SR 71 then have an interchange with I-75 (Exit 128) and widen to an undivided 4-lane shortly before coming to an end at an intersection with US 25W/SR 9/SR 116 (N Main Street) just north of downtown.

Major intersections

See also

List of highways numbered 441

References

 Tennessee
441
Transportation in Sevier County, Tennessee
Transportation in Blount County, Tennessee
Transportation in Knox County, Tennessee
Transportation in Knoxville, Tennessee
Transportation in Anderson County, Tennessee